Ángel José Macín (born 18 March 1967 in Malabrigo) is an Argentine Roman Catholic bishop.

Ordained to the priesthood on 9 July 1992, Macín was named bishop of the Roman Catholic Diocese of Reconquista, Argentina on 12 October 2013.

References 

1967 births
Living people
People from General Obligado Department
21st-century Roman Catholic bishops in Argentina
Roman Catholic bishops of Reconquista